Jamahl Jerette Knowles (born July 13, 1988 in Vancouver, British Columbia) is a Canadian football defensive back who is currently a free agent. He was signed as undrafted free agent by the Alouettes on July 1, 2013. He played CIS Football with the Calgary Dinos.

References

External links
Montreal Alouettes bio

1988 births
Living people
Calgary Dinos football players
Canadian football defensive backs
Montreal Alouettes players
Players of Canadian football from British Columbia
Canadian football people from Vancouver